Thomas Eriksen may refer to:

 Thomas Bruun Eriksen (born 1979), Danish road bicycle racer
 Thomas Hylland Eriksen (born 1962), Norwegian anthropologist